Çobanlar is a village in the District of Gazipaşa, Antalya Province, Turkey.

History
The village's name is mentioned as being Çobanlı in the Ottoman Archives.

References

Villages in Gazipaşa District